The circulation problem and its variants are a generalisation of network flow problems, with the added constraint of a lower bound on edge flows, and with flow conservation also being required for the source and sink (i.e. there are no special nodes). In variants of the problem, there are multiple commodities flowing through the network, and a cost on the flow.

Definition 
Given flow network  with:

, lower bound on flow from node  to node ,
, upper bound on flow from node  to node ,
, cost of a unit of flow on 

and the constraints:

,
 (flow cannot appear or disappear in nodes).

Finding a flow assignment satisfying the constraints gives a solution to the given circulation problem. 

In the minimum cost variant of the problem, minimize

Multi-commodity circulation 
In a multi-commodity circulation problem, you also need to keep track of the flow of the individual commodities:

{|
|-
|  || The total flow.
|}

There is also a lower bound on each flow of commodity.

{|
| 
|}

The conservation constraint must be upheld individually for the commodities:

Solution 
For the circulation problem, many polynomial algorithms have been developed (e.g., Edmonds–Karp algorithm, 1972; Tarjan 1987-1988). Tardos found the first strongly polynomial algorithm.
 

For the case of multiple commodities, the problem is NP-complete for integer flows. For fractional flows, it is solvable in polynomial time, as one can formulate the problem as a linear program.

Related problems 

Below are given some problems, and how to solve them with the general circulation setup given above.

 Minimum cost multi-commodity circulation problem - Using all constraints given above.
 Minimum cost circulation problem - Use a single commodity
 Multi-commodity circulation - Solve without optimising cost.
 Simple circulation - Just use one commodity, and no cost.
Let  for all other edges.
 Minimum cost multi-commodity flow problem - As above, but minimize the cost.
 Minimum cost flow problem - As above, with 1 commodity.
 Minimum cost maximum flow problem - First find the maximum flow amount .
 All-pairs shortest path - Let all capacities be unlimited, and find a flow of 1 for  commodities, one for each pair of nodes.

References 

Network flow problem
Mathematical problems